Mosque of Al-Ghamamah is one of the oldest mosques in Medina, Saudi Arabia, located in the place believed to be where the Islamic prophet Muhammad performed an Eid prayer in the year 631. It is also narrated that Muhammad offered Salat ul-Istasqa when the city of Madina faced a shortage of rain. For a while, this mosque was closed for daily prayers because of its proximity to the Al-Masjid an-Nabawi. However quite recently it has been reopened for the worshipers for praying. Five times prayers are held in this mosque now with an internal sound system to avoid the clash of sounds from the Prophet's Mosque. The mosque is one of the historical relics of Medina.

Location 
It is located at 500 meters west of As-Salam door of Al-Masjid an-Nabawi.

Etymology 
"Ghamamah" means cloud, and it is named as such as it is narrated that rain clouds covered the city when Muhammad had performed Salat ul-Istasqa here.

History 
The mosque was built during the reign of the Caliph Umar bin Abdul Aziz between the hijri calendar of 86 to 93, and renovated by the Sultan Hasan bin Muhammad bin Qalawan Ash-Shalihi in 1340 during the Sharifate of Mecca era. It was renovated again by the Sharif Saifuddin Inal Al-Ala'i in 1622, and the time of the Sultan Abd-ul-Mejid I in 1859 during the Ottoman era, using new tools and the look resembled more or less the shape of today. After that it was renovated again during the time of the Sultan Sultan Abdul Hamid II and by the Saudi government.

Description 
The mosque is rectangular shaped, and made of two parts, which are entrance door and prayer room. The entrance door is also rectangular shaped and has a length of 26 meters and width of 4 meters, and has five dome-shaped circles drawn on facade. Prayer room has a length of 30 meters and width of 15 meters, and has six domes in the shape of a circle. The largest dome is at the top of the mihrab.

See also

 List of mosques in Saudi Arabia
 Lists of mosques
 List of mosques in Medina

References 

Mosques in Medina